İmrallı can refer to:

 İmrallı, Bayat
 İmrallı, Çivril